Jane H. Davidson is an American mechanical engineer whose research involves renewable energy, thermal energy storage, alternative fuel, and solar-powered carbon capture and storage for the energy needs of homes, workplaces, and vehicles. She is a professor of mechanical engineering at the University of Minnesota, where she directs the Solar Energy Laboratory, and is the former Ronald L. and Janet A. Christenson chair of renewable energy at the university.

Education and career
Davidson majored in Engineering Science and Mechanics at the University of Tennessee, where she earned a bachelor's degree in 1975 and a master's degree in 1976. She completed a Ph.D. in mechanical engineering at Duke University in 1984.

She has worked as a researcher at the Oak Ridge National Laboratory and the Research Triangle Institute, and as a faculty member at the University of Delaware and Colorado State University. She moved to the University of Minnesota in 1993.

Recognition
Davidson was elected as a Fellow of the American Society of Mechanical Engineers (ASME) in 1998. She has chaired the ASME Solar Energy Division, and was given the ASME Dedicated Service Award in 2003. In 2012 the ASME gave her their Frank Kreith Energy Award, "for significant research on solar systems for residential buildings and solar thermo chemical cycles to produce fuels".

Davidson is also a Fellow of the American Solar Energy Society (ASES), and was the 2007 winner of the ASES Charles Greeley Abbot Award.

References

External links

Oral Memoirs of Jane Davidson, transcript, Baylor University Institute for Oral History Interviews, Interviewed by Byron Newberry on September 22, 2005, in Minneapolis, Minneota

Year of birth missing (living people)
Living people
American mechanical engineers
American women engineers
People associated with solar power
University of Tennessee alumni
Duke University alumni
Oak Ridge National Laboratory people
University of Delaware faculty
Colorado State University faculty
University of Minnesota faculty
Fellows of the American Society of Mechanical Engineers